Carlton may refer to:

People and fictional characters 
 Carlton (name), a list of people and fictional characters with the given name or surname
 Carlton, a pen name used by Joseph Caldwell (1773–1835), American educator, Presbyterian minister, mathematician and astronomer

Places

Australia 
 Carlton, New South Wales, a suburb of Sydney
 Carlton, Tasmania, a locality in Tasmania
 Carlton, Victoria, a suburb of Melbourne

Canada 
 Carlton, Edmonton, Alberta, a neighbourhood
 Carlton, Saskatchewan, a hamlet
 Fort Carlton, a Hudson's Bay Company fur trading post built in 1810, near present-day Carlton, Saskatchewan
 Carlton Trail, a historic trail near Fort Carlton
 Carlton Street, Toronto, Ontario

England 
 Carlton, Bedfordshire, a village
 Carlton, Cambridgeshire, a village
 Carlton, County Durham, a village and civil parish
 Carlton, Leicestershire, a village
 Carlton, Nottinghamshire, a suburb to the east of Nottingham
 Carlton (UK Parliament constituency), abolished in 1983
 Carlton in Lindrick, Nottinghamshire
 Carlton, Suffolk, a village near Saxmundham
 Carlton, a hamlet in the parish of Helmsley, North Yorkshire
 Carlton, Hambleton, North Yorkshire, a civil parish
 Carlton, Richmondshire, North Yorkshire, a village
 Carlton, Selby, North Yorkshire, a village and civil parish
 Carlton, South Yorkshire, a village in the Metropolitan Borough of Barnsley
 Carlton, Rothwell, West Yorkshire, a village
 Carlton, Wharfedale, West Yorkshire, a civil parish

United States 
 Carlton, Alabama, an unincorporated community
 Carlton, Georgia, a city
 Carlton Township, Tama County, Iowa
 Carlton, Kansas, a city
 Carlton County, Minnesota
 Carlton, Minnesota, a city and the county seat
 Carlton Peak, Cook County, Minnesota
 Carlton, New York, a town
 Carlton, Oregon, a city
 Carlton, Texas, an unincorporated community
 Carlton, U.S. Virgin Islands, a settlement
 Carlton, Washington, an unincorporated community
 Carlton, Wisconsin, a town

Businesses and brands 
 Carlton Car Company, whose output was four cars constructed in Gisborne, New Zealand, in the 1920s
 Carlton Carriage Company, a defunct English coachbuilder from Willesden, North London, UK
 Carlton Cards, a Canadian greeting card company
 Carlton Cinema, Dublin, Ireland
 Carlton Communications, a former media company in the United Kingdom
 Carlton Cycles, an English bicycle maker in Nottinghamshire, absorbed by Raleigh Bicycle Company in 1960
 Carlton Hotel (disambiguation)
 Carlton Hotels & Suites, a multinational hospitality company in the Middle East
 Carlton Publishing Group, a UK book publishing company, with three imprints
 Carlton Records, American record label between 1957 and 1964
 Carlton Screen Advertising, an Irish cinema screen advertising brand, now called Wide Eye Media
 Carlton Sports, a manufacturer of badminton racquets and shuttlecocks
 Carlton Tavern, a former pub in Kilburn, London
 Carlton Television, a television broadcasting company in the United Kingdom
 Carlton Theatre, a former West End theatre in London, now a cinema
 Carlton Ware, English Stoke-on-Trent commercial pottery
 Carlton Draught, an Australian beer
 Carlton, a brand of cigarettes produced by American company Brown & Williamson

In sports 
 Carlton Cricket Club (Barbados)
 Carlton Football Club, a professional Australian rules football club in the Australian Football League
 Carlton S.C., a defunct Australian association football (soccer) club
 The Carlton (LPGA Tour), a golf tournament

Other uses 
 Vauxhall Carlton, an executive car produced by Vauxhall Motors
 Lotus Carlton, a modified version of the Vauxhall Carlton
 The Carlton Academy, a secondary school in Nottinghamshire, England
 Carlton Centre, a skyscraper and shopping centre located in downtown Johannesburg, South Africa
 Carlton Club, a members-only club in London
 Carlton Dramatic Society, an amateur dramatics group in Wimbledon, London
 Carlton House (disambiguation)
 Carlton Towers, a country house in Carlton, North Yorkshire
 The Carlton, a dance routine by Carlton Banks in The Fresh Prince of Bel-Air

See also 
 Carlton Hill (disambiguation)
 Carlton-on-Trent, Nottinghamshire
 Carleton (disambiguation)
 Charlton (disambiguation)